Gujranwala City 2017 Is Most Educated City In Pakistan, 62.4 percent people's educated in Gujranwala

This is a list of educational institutions in Gujranwala, Pakistan.

Schools
Youth Academy
Youth Institute of Technology
Youth Group of Schools and Colleges
Government College Gujranwala
Greenz College Sialkot road (Gujranwala)
Kin's International Public High School, Gujranwala
Aspire Group Of Colleges Gujranwala
The Savvy Schools Gujranwala
SOFT Solutions College (Gujranwala)
Cantt View Public School Gujranwala, (Dogranwala Warraich)
The City School, Gujranwala Campus, Sialkot by. pass Gujranwala
Roots School System, DC Road, Gujranwala
Science Base School
The Challenge School System, Outside Khiali Gate, Mubarik Shah Gujranwala.
Pakistan International Public School and College, Gujranwala (PIPS)
Main Campus: Satellite Town
Boys Campus: Sialkot Bypass Road
Jinnah Campus: Jinnah Road
Quaid-e-Azam Divisional Public School, GT rd.
Beacon House School System, Palm tree Campus: Sialkot bypass road., Wapda town Campus, Civil Lines Campus
Army Public Schools and Colleges, Cantt.
Bloomfield Hall School, Satellite Town & Cantt.
St. Joseph's Schools, Satellite Town, Khokharki
St. Peter's School, Civil Lines
Bibi n Baba school, Civil Lines
 Punjab Colleges
Gift Colleges
Superior Colleges
Youth Group of Schools and Colleges
Youth Academy
Youth Institute of Technology
ILM Colleges
National Group of Colleges
KIPS Academy
KIPS Colleges
Pioneer Academy, Satellite Town, Near Billa Pan Chock, Gujranwala 
Lahore Grammar School, Sattlite Town, Skt. bypass road near Garden town
Science Focus School
Federal Science College, Wapda Town
Noor School System, DC Colony
Al-Farooq Public School, Shalimar Town
Jamia-tul-Bannat, Model Town
Aisha Girls Degree College, Shalimar Town
National Aims School, G. Magnolia Park Housing Scheme
Grammar Public School, Skt. bypass road, Satellite town
Science Locus Schools, Stlite Town
Elite Colleges, Stlite Town, Cantt.
The College of Law
M. Ali Jinnah Law College
Premier Law College
 The Star inst. Skt Road
Habib Builders Associates Academy 
Shaheen Islamia Model School (boys camps and girls camps)St#4 Atta Road Shaheen Abad, Gujranwala
[Future Vision School System (Boys Campus)], Gujranwala
[Jadeed Dastgir Ideal High Schools], Gujranwala
Punjab School System, Professors Colony, Gujranwala
 Zain Public High School, Jinnah Road Link D.C Road, Gujranwala.  
Tahir Science Academy
Gujranwala Grammar School System, Sialkot Bypass, Gujranwala
Gujranwala College of Computing Gujranwala
Pakistan Foundation Model School
Apple Seed School System is located in main city area. The building comprises Pre-Primary, Primary and Pre-Secondary section floors.
Askari Public School 13, 19- Moh.Islamabad
Dawn Public High School, Garjakh
Everest School System, 19/29 Mohalla Islamabad, Gujranwala
Eden Home School System & Child Development Centre, Satellite Town
Future Vision School System, Shaheenabad, Gujranwala.
Focus Computer College, Model Town, Gujranwala.
Focus Education System, Model Town, Gujranwala.
Focus National School, Model Town, Gujranwala.
Harward New Generation School, Satellite Town
The Oxford Science High School, Allama Iqbal Town, Gujranwala Cantt.
Pacific International High School, Asad Colony
 The Pakistan School                                     
Punjab Public Secondary School
Schools of Excellence
St. Mary's Girls High School
Gujranwala Institute of Medical and Emerging Sciences
Jalal Model High School For Girls Barkat Colony Gujranwala
School One Education System, Baghban Pura, Gujranwala
Shaheen Islamia Model School (boys camps and girls camps)St#4 Atta Road Shaheen Abad, Gujranwala.
Shaukat-e-Islam High School & College Jalal Balaggan(Via Ghakkhar City) Gujranwala.
National College of Computer Sciences (Gujranwala)
Air Foundation School System, Mian Zia ul Haq Road Civil lines, Gujranwala.
CMS College for Boys, Gujranwala.
Al-Falah School System Shaheenabad Gujranwala-.
Best School System 39/A Satellite town Gujranwala.
Pakistan Foundation Model School 21 -A, Gujranwala 52250.
The Unique School Sialkot Road, Angel's Campus, Opposite Session Court, Gujranwala.
American International School 21 -A, Gujranwala 52250
CMS College for Girls, Gujranwala
A+ school system, shahra e quaid e azam rahwali cantt
Lyceum campus girls high school wapda town gujranwala
Allied School (Ghakhar Campus)
Govt. Higher Secondary School Ghakkhar (Boys)
Govt. Higher Secondary School Ghakkhar No.1 (Boys)
Lincoln Grammar School (People's Colony )
Lincoln Academy Of Science And Commerce  (People's Colony )

Colleges and Universities
Saeed Islamic College Gujranwala 58-A, Satellite Town, Gujranwala
University of the Punjab, Gujranwala Campus, bypass road Near Shalimar Town, Gujranwala
University of Health Sciences, Gujranwala Medical College, Ali Pure Chatha Road, Gujranwala
Pakistan Atomic Energy Commission, Gujranwala Inst. of Nuclear Medicine, Sialkot Road, Nizampure, Gujranwala
Allama Iqbal Open University, Regional Campus Gujranwala
Virtual University of Pakistan, Gujranwala Campus, GT Road Gujranwala
Pakistan Military Aviation Training School, Link Air Base Road off Main Shahra-e-Qauid-e-Azam, Cantt. Gujranwala
University Of Sargodha, Gujranwala Campus, Gujranwala Campus, Dastgir Road Satellite Town & Sialkot Byepass road Gujranwala
GIFT University, Sialkot By-pass Road near Garden Town, Gujranwala
Government of Commerce People's Colony Gujranwala
CMS College for Boys, Satellite Town, Gujranwala.
Govt. College, Satellite Town, Gujranwala
Govt. Post Graduate College for Girls, Satellite Town, Gujranwala
Govt. Post Graduate College for Girls, Model Town, Gujranwala
Govt. Islamia Post Graduate College, Islamia College Road, Gujranwala
Govt. College for Girls, Islamia College Road, Gujranwala
Govt. College for Girls, Niyaean Chowk, Urdu Bazar, Gujranwala
Govt. Post Graduate College for Girls, Model Town, Gujranwala
Govt. Degree College, People's Colony, Gujranwala
Govt. College for Girls, People's Colony, Gujranwala
Federal Govt. College, Cantt., Gujranwala
Federal Govt. College for Girls, Cantt., Gujranwala
Govt. College for Girls, Cantt., Gujranwala
Chenab College Of Engineering And Technology Gujranwala
GOVT College Of Commerce Nowshera road
GOVT College Of Commerce for Girls, Civil Lines, Gujranwala
GOVT College Of Technology, GT road Gujranwala
GOVT Leather Tech. Instt. GT road Gujranwala
GOVT tech, training Inst. Pasrur road Gujranwala
GOVT Vocational training Instt. for Girls, Cantt. Gujranwala
Sanat Zaar, Jinnah Road Gujranwala
University of Central Punjab, Gujranwala Campus, Sialkot bypass road Gujranwala
Chenab College Of Engineering And Technology Gujranwala

External links

Universities and colleges in Gujranwala District
Gujranwala
Gujranwala